The men's competition in the lightweight  (– 69 kg) division was held on 7–8 November 2011.

Schedule

Medalists

Records

Results

References

(Pages 27, 32, 34 & 36) Start List 
2011 IWF World Championships Results Book Pages 35–37 

2011 World Weightlifting Championships